Francis Bernard Condon (November 11, 1891 – November 23, 1965) was a U.S. Representative from Rhode Island.

Early life and career
Condon was born in Central Falls, Rhode Island and attended the public schools. He graduated from Georgetown University Law School, Washington, D.C., in 1916. He was then admitted to the bar in 1916 and commenced practice in Pawtucket, Rhode Island. He served as a sergeant in the One Hundred and Fifty-second Regiment, Depot Brigade, Twenty-third Company, from May 1918 to June 1919. He was also the Rhode Island department commander of the American Legion in 1927 and 1928.

Political career and death
Condon served as member of the Rhode Island House of Representatives from 1921 to 1926, serving as Democratic floor leader from 1923 to 1926. He also served as member of the Democratic State committee from 1924 to 1926 and 1928–1930, serving as a member of the executive committee from 1928 to 1930. He was an unsuccessful candidate for Lieutenant Governor of Rhode Island in 1928.

Condon was elected as a Democrat to the Seventy-first Congress to fill the vacancy caused by the resignation of Jeremiah E. O'Connell and, at the same time, was elected to the Seventy-second Congress. He was re-elected to the Seventy-third and Seventy-fourth Congresses and served from November 4, 1930, until his resignation on January 10, 1935, having been appointed an Associate Justice of the Rhode Island Supreme Court, the newly Democratic state legislature having appointed an entirely new court. He served in that capacity until January 7, 1958, when he was appointed Chief Justice. He remained Chief Justice until his death in Boston, Massachusetts on November 23, 1965. He was interred in Mount St. Mary's Cemetery in Pawtucket, Rhode Island.

References

Sources

1891 births
1965 deaths
People from Central Falls, Rhode Island
Democratic Party members of the United States House of Representatives from Rhode Island
Democratic Party members of the Rhode Island House of Representatives
Chief Justices of the Rhode Island Supreme Court
20th-century American judges
20th-century American politicians
Georgetown University Law Center alumni
United States Army soldiers
American military personnel of World War I